The Kiss of Morning is the fourth solo album by Blur guitarist Graham Coxon, released on 21 October 2002 in the UK, being the first of Coxon's albums since his initial departure from Blur.

Background
In an interview with Q, Coxon explained that the title of the album stemmed from his changed outlook on life after struggling with alcoholism and becoming sober.

Track listing
All words and music by Graham Coxon.

"All I Wanna Do Iz Listen to Yuz" was later released in the UK as a B-side to "Bittersweet Bundle of Misery" in 2004.

Personnel
Graham Coxon — guitars, bass, drums, vocals, harmonica, percussion, producer, sleeve painting
Louis Vause — piano, Fender Rhodes, Hammond
B. J. Cole — pedal steel
Mike Pelanconi — producer, recording
Anna Norlander — sleeve photos
Alex Huchinson — sleeve design

References

Graham Coxon albums
2002 albums